In most telecommunications organizations, a virtual channel is a method of remapping the program number as used in H.222 Program Association Tables and Program Mapping Tables to a channel number that can be entered as digits on a receiver's remote control.

Often, virtual channels are implemented in digital television to help users to go to channels easily and in general to ease the transition from analogue to digital broadcasting. Assigning virtual channels is most common in parts of the world where TV stations were colloquially named after the RF channel they were transmitting on ("Channel 6 Springfield"), as was common in North America during the analogue TV era. In other parts of the world, such as Europe, virtual channels are rarely used or needed, because TV stations there identify themselves by name, not by RF channel or callsign.

A "virtual channel" was first used for DigiCipher 2 in North America. It was later called a logical channel number (LCN) and used for private European Digital Video Broadcasting extensions widely used by the NDS Group and by NorDig in other markets.

Pay television operators were the first to use these systems for channel reassignment and rearrangement to meet their need to group channels by their content or origin and, to a lesser extent, to localize advertising.

Free-to-air stations using Advanced Television Systems Committee standards (ATSC) used the same television frequency channel allocation that the NTSC channel was using when both were simulcasting. They achieved this by the DigiCipher 2 method. Viewers could then use the same number to bring up either service.

Free-to-air DVB network operators, such as DTV Services Ltd. (d.b.a. Freeview) and Freeview New Zealand Ltd., use the NorDig method and follow the same practice as pay-TV operators. The exception is Freeview Australia Ltd., which also use the NorDig method and partly follow the ATSC practice of using the same VHF radio-frequency channel allocation that the PAL channel is simulcasting on from the metropolitan station's main transmission point (i2, 7, 9, and 10) with the major and minor format emulated by multiplying by ten.

Implementation
The DigiCipher 2 method uses a privately defined virtual channel table (VCT) to set the channel's major and minor numbers that appear on-screen separated by a decimal point or dash. The major number for ATSC represents the original analog or non-simulcast channel frequency while the minor is a sequentially assigned number for the selected channel with zero reserved for the analog channel. The channel may also be marked as hidden from the viewer.

The DVB extensions use privately defined descriptors within the Bouquet Association Table for DVB-S or the Network Information Table for DVB-T. The NorDig version allows for marking a channel as hidden, while the NDS Group version simply omits the channel entry.

The DVB system neither promotes nor mentions either system due to the simple fact that the already defined H.222 Program number and Transport Stream ID can achieve the same purpose and also hide a channel by simply omitting it from the Program Association table.

All these methods share the same principle of not allowing any kind of viewer reordering as could be achieved under analog and generic digital systems. This locked-down  ordering is one of the main criticisms of using either method.

Digital television multiple channels
Because DTV can carry any number of streams referred to as multiplexing, program numbers can be used to group them into more than one channel which can then be reassigned by virtual or logical channel numbers.

United States and Canada

An example of the ATSC major and minor numbers used for a station in the United States or Canada would be to typically have its main programming airing on say channel 8 (the "major channel") with analog on 8.0 and digital on 8.1 (the first two "minor channels") with other entertainment channels being below 8.99 on channels 8.2, 8.3, and up and any additional informational data channels ranging from 8.100 to 8.999.  The channels can also be displayed using a hyphen (such as 8-1) or a space; however, on a common seven-segment display, a decimal point would not waste a whole character.  The decimal point is more familiar to FM radio listeners who tune by frequency rather than channel, and avoids confusion with ranges of values (for example, 2-4 may be misinterpreted as the range 2 to 4 instead of the fourth sub-channel of channel 2).

Most stations in the United States follow the ATSC numbering guidelines; however, there are some exceptions for low-power stations such as New York City's WNYZ-LD, which was temporarily broadcasting on VHF channel 6 in digital, but used the virtual channel 1.1, instead of 6.  This operation lasted for approximately one year beginning in November 2008, after which WNYZ-LD reverted to low-power analog.

The assignment of virtual channels in the United States is defined within the stream via terrestrial or cable versions of a "Virtual Channel Table" as outlined by ATSC document "A/65", Annex B. Rules for assignment of major channel numbers are as follows:
Existing analog stations were assigned a major channel number matching their existing analog number
New digital stations assigned to a channel whose matching major channel number is not in use must use that number
New digital stations assigned to a channel whose matching major channel number is in use (by a former analog station) must reciprocate, using the major channel number that matches the actual channel of the station in question.
These rules generally ensure that no overlapping will occur, although in the case of stations where large numbers of stations in adjacent markets are in close proximity to each other, it is possible that such overlap can occasionally happen (see, for example, the case of WJLP). Additionally, stations may broadcast some of their subchannels under major channel(s) in the 70–99 range, so long as multiple stations do not attempt to use the same major channel(s). These numbers are certain to be unused, as 69 was the highest assigned channel prior to the conversion to digital broadcasting. The document does not address the use of certain other major channel numbers:
Numbers below 70 that were never used in NTSC (0, 1 and 37)
The real numbers of stations that are using virtual channels from 38 to 69 (these stations are not covered by the reciprocity rule, as real station numbers are not assigned above 36)
Numbers in the range of 38–69 that are not being used by a former analog station
Additionally, broadcasters owning more than one station that overlap in coverage area may set all of the channels to use the major channel of just one of the stations, so long as different minor channel numbers are used to avoid overlap.

When the United States began buying back licenses in a broadcast spectrum auction in 2017, it also allowed companies that had a duopoly in a market to sell one of the licenses but continue to use the virtual channel of the sold channel on a subchannel of the other. For example, Sunbeam Television sold WLVI in the auction, but in turn was allowed to use its virtual channel 56 on WHDH, which uses virtual channel 7 for its main channel; thus, the WHDH license uses both virtual channels, 7 and 56, on the same license.

The range for pay TV free-to-air local stations is from 2 to 29.  All other channels are based on the service provider's preference.

Usage examples
The order for cable provider Charter Spectrum:
 Reserved for subscriber on-demand services
 Basic subscriber channels are from 30 to 120
 Extra subscriber channels are from 121 to 199
 Informational subscriber channels are from 200 to 244
 Sporting subscriber channels are from 245 to 279
 Movie subscriber channels are from 280 to 299
 Latin American targeted subscriber channels from 300 to 399 and 800 to 899
 Extra HD subscriber channels are from 400 to 499
 Extra movie subscriber channels are from 500 to 599
 Extra foreign subscriber channels are from 600 to 699
 Extra season pass NBA/NHL/MLB subscriber channels from 700 to 769
 Premium adult subscriber channels from 770 to 799
 Extra audio only music subscriber channels from 900 to 999

The order for satellite (DBS) provider DirecTV:
 Reserved for DirecTV subscriber information (as well as 201)
 Local free-to-air stations are from 2 to 69
 Shopping subscriber channels are from 70 to 99
 Extra movie subscriber channels are from 100 to 200
 Basic (and extra HD) subscriber channels are from 202 to 389
 NY east and CA west coast FTA network subscriber channels from 390 to 400
 Latin American targeted subscriber channels from 401 to 499
 Premium subscriber channels from 500 to 573
 Premium adult subscriber channels from 575 to 599
 Extra regional sporting subscriber channels from 600 to 699
 Extra season pass NFL/NBA/NHL subscriber channels from 700 to 799
 Extra audio only music subscriber channels from 800 to 999
 Extra non-North/Latin American subscriber channels from 2000 to 2199
 DirecTV system/hidden interactive channels from 9000 to 9539 and 9950
 DirecTV system/hidden HD channels from 9540 to 9559
 DirecTV system/hidden instrumental channels from 9560 to 9599

Mexico

Upon the introduction of digital television in Mexico, most stations used virtual channels that matched their former analog channel positions, with a select number of stations branding as their physical channel (such as XHMNU-TDT in Monterrey, which eschewed virtual channel 53 for 35). However, Mexican television is considerably more centralized than in other ATSC countries, with three of the four national commercial networks branding with their Mexico City channel numbers. There was also the potential that new entrants, which would almost universally be on UHF, would be disadvantaged by higher virtual channels than existing stations that began on VHF—a particular concern given the recent award of a national television network to Grupo Imagen.

In December 2015, the Federal Telecommunications Institute opened a public comment period on public guidelines for the assignment of virtual channels, and on June 17, 2016, the IFT officially released the final version of the guidelines. The plan called for standardization of virtual channels according to network, not former analog position, with automatic assignment based on the programming information on file with the IFT; it also set a date of October 27 for a coordinated switch of all virtual channels. In early September, a full list of virtual channel assignments was released.

The plan eliminated much of the local variance for national and regional networks. Prior to standardization, Canal 5, a national network, was seen on 25 different virtual channel numbers in different Mexican cities; the plan standardized it as channel 5 nationwide.

In all, the IFT accredited nine national television networks and awarded them national rights to a virtual channel. Five were commercial: Azteca Trece (channel 1, changed from 13 at the request of TV Azteca); Las Estrellas (channel 2), Imagen (channel 3), Canal 5 (channel 5), and Azteca 7 (channel 7)). Additionally, the national public broadcasters received channels: Canal Once (channel 11), Una Voz con Todos (channel 14, later renamed Canal Catorce as a result), TV UNAM (channel 20), and Canal 22 (channel 22). The IFT also awarded common numbers to 14 regional networks (primarily operated by state governments) and virtual channels to nearly 100 local stations across the country. Local stations were mostly assigned to channels 4, 8, 10, 12, and less commonly 9, as well as other numbers. Some retained existing channel numbers, particularly if they broadcast on UHF in analog. Initially, channel 6 was reserved, in the event that a 2017 auction of local TV stations produced a national network; this did not come to pass, and Multimedios Televisión stations now use channel 6.

The largest exception to standardization is on the US-Mexico border, where due to the presence of US stations on desired virtual channels and objections from the US Federal Communications Commission, 11 Mexican stations operate on virtual channels other than would be expected. In Tijuana, only one Mexican station was able to change its virtual channel.

Australia

In Australia, allocation of logical channel numbers is governed by guidelines set by the commercial broadcasters' association, Free TV Australia.

These are defined within the terrestrial broadcast stream using the NorDig descriptor format within the DVB "Network Information Table."

LCNs in Australia may have one, two or three digits. Each network is allocated LCNs starting with a certain prefix - for instance, all metropolitan Nine Network services use LCNs beginning with the digit '9'. Generally, but not always, the single-digit LCN is allocated to the primary SD service (Network 10's high definition-channel 10 HD being the main exception). LCNs need not be contiguous, and a channel may be identified by more than one LCN. For instance, ABC Television's primary ABC TV service is allocated LCNs 2 and 21; the latter allows it to be easily accessed amongst other ABC services which lie in the 21–24 range.

Regional affiliates of the three metropolitan networks are provided with a different LCN prefix. For instance, channels owned by affiliates of the Nine Network (in this case NBN Television) are prefixed with the digit '8' rather than '9'. This allows areas that are part of both a metropolitan market and a regional market, such as the Gold Coast, Sunshine Coast and Central Coast, to receive all local commercial services. The ABC and SBS use the same prefix in all areas.

Prefixes for remote-area services are intended to be overlaid over this model. When digital transmission starts in these areas, services licensed for the Remote Central and Eastern Australia licence area (Imparja and Southern Cross Central) have been reserved the "metropolitan" prefixes corresponding to their affiliation; those in Remote Western Australia (GWN and WIN WA) the "regional" prefixes.

A number of LCNs are reserved for various reasons:

 LCN 4 was originally intended for a free-to-air video program guide. In practice, the LCN 4 prefix has for most of its life been largely unused, except in Sydney (where it was used by the Digital Forty Four trial datacasting service from 2004 to 2010). Since 2010, capital city community television stations (or "Channel 31" stations, after their typical analogue channel position) use LCN 44.
 The LCN range 350-399 is intended to be allocated by receivers to channels which either duplicate a stronger signal's LCN, or are transmitted without an LCN. For instance, if two broadcasts of LCN 2 were found, one signal (generally the stronger) will be allocated to LCN 2, and the weaker should be allocated to, say, LCN 350.
 The LCN range 450-499 is intended for use by trial services by non-broadcasters.

Usage examples
The order for Freeview (aka FreeTV) is defined by broadcaster transport:

 Ten Network metropolitan HD channel is on channel 1
 ABC primary SD channel is on channel 2
 SBS primary SD channel is on channel 3
 VAST regional news guide or in Darwin, First Nations TV is on channel 4.
 Ten Network regional primary SD channel is on channel 5
 7 Regional primary SD channel is on channel 6
 7 Network metropolitan primary SD channel is on channel 7
 9 Regional and 9 Network Northern NSW primary SD channel is on channel 8
 9 Network metropolitan primary SD channel is on channel 9
 Ten Network metropolitan primary SD channel is on channel 10
 Ten Network metropolitan other TV channels are from 11 to 19
 ABC HD channel is on channel 20
 ABC other TV channels are from 21 to 29
 SBS HD channel is on channel 30
 SBS other TV channels are from 31 to 39
 The local public service is on channel 44
 Miscellaneous/Government-owned channels are from 40 to 43 and 45 to 49
 Ten Network Regional HD channel is on channel 50
 Ten Network regional other TV channels are from 51 to 59
 7 Network regional HD channel is on channel 60
 7 regional other TV channels are from 61 to 69
 7 Network metropolitan HD channel is on channel 70
 7 Network metropolitan other TV channels are from 71 to 79
 9 regional and 9 Network Northern NSW HD channel is on channel 80
 9 Regional and 9 Network Northern NSW other TV channels are from 81 to 89
 9 Network metropolitan HD channel is on channel 90
 9 Network metropolitan other TV channels are from 91 to 99
 Ten Network extended other TV channels are from 100 to 199
 ABC Audio Only channels are from 200 to 219
 ABC out of region/extended channels are from 220 to 299
 SBS out of region/extended channels are from 300 to 349
 Any out of region channels are from 350 to 399
 Regional VAST news channels are from 400 to 499
 VAST community channels are from 600 to 699
 7 Network extended other TV channels are from 700 to 799
 VAST informational channels are from 800 to 899
 9 Network extended other TV channels are from 900 to 999

The order for Foxtel (who wholesale to Austar and Optus) is largely based on the channel's content:

 System Services from 1 to 99 and above 989
 General Entertainment from 100 to 149
 Time-shifted from 150 to 169
 Specialist from 170 to 179
 Community from 180 to 199
 High Definition from 200 to 299
 Interactive/Miscellaneous from 300 to 399
 Movies from 400 to 499
 Sport from 500 to 599
 News/Informational from 600 to 699
 Young Children from 700 to 799
 Music from 800 to 829
 Music Audio Only from 830 to 849
 Free to Air Audio Only from 850 to 899
 Pay Per View from 900 to 939
 European from 940 to 959
 Adult Pay Per View from 960 to 989
 Help on 999

Europe, Africa and the Middle East

In Europe, Africa and the Middle East, there is no special numbering system for subchannels; two related "channels" (that is, programme streams) may have completely unrelated numbers (for example, in the United Kingdom, ITV is channel 3 and its digital sister channel ITV2 is channel 6 on Freeview).

In the United Kingdom and Ireland, Freeview channel numbers are defined within the terrestrial broadcast stream using the NorDig descriptor format within the DVB "Network Information Table".

Usage examples
The order for Freeview is largely based on the channel's content:

 General Entertainment from 1 to 99
 High Definition from 100 to 119
 Young Children from 201 to 219
 News/Public Service from 230 to 239
 MHEG-5 non-broadcast Internet streaming are from 260 to 299
 Reserved for YouView from 300 - 599
 MHEG-5 Interactive from 600 to 609
 Adult Pay Per View from 670 to 695
 Audio Only from 700 to 777
 Tests and old channels from 790 to 799

The order for the Republic of Ireland's Saorview is based on the priority of the channel to that of the state owned broadcaster:

 State owned RTÉ primary HD TV channel
 State owned RTÉ secondary HD TV channel
 other TV channels from 3 to 5
 other state owned RTÉ TV channels from 6 to 8
 state owned RTÉ Audio Only channels from 200 to 209

In continental and eastern Europe, virtual channels are not used, since television sets and receivers there allow users to freely assign arbitrary "programme numbers" or "programme letters" to channels.

Stations still market themselves as "first", "second", or "third" channel (and so on), or "channel A", "channel B" or "channel C", etc., but this reflects historic or colloquial usage, or is purely done for marketing purposes. For example, in Germany the term "third programme" refers to the local public station, which was usually the third TV station to go on air in most areas. There is no connection between these terms and the transmitting RF channel. Referencing above's example, the third programmes in Germany never transmitted on a RF channel below 21.

Virtual channels are also used on direct broadcast satellites, such as Dish Network, DirecTV, and Astra.  Rather than a few dozen channels with a few subchannels each, these services map to a range of hundreds of individually numbered channels. This is true of digital cable and satellite radio services, as well.

Japan

In Japan, digital terrestrial TV broadcasters in each region are allocated a "remote control key ID" (or, "remocon key ID"), currently numbered from 1 to 12. Remote control ID allocations for broadcasters outside the Kanto region generally follow their Tokyo-based network flagships; however, some stations in some prefectures deviate from this. Current technical standards allow for expansion to a maximum of 16 broadcasters per region.

Each underlying channel is then assigned a three-digit number, which is based on their assigned remote control ID, followed by the sub-channel number. For example, NHK Educational TV is assigned remote control ID 2 (nationwide). Their primary channel is therefore assigned virtual channel 021. If the broadcaster multichannels (of which the ISDB-T standard allows up to three standard-definition streams), the additional streams would be assigned virtual channels 022 and 023, respectively. Current standards allow for a maximum of eight virtual channels per broadcaster (in this example 021-028).

Additional datacasting services use virtual channels in the 200–799 range – in this example, the network could use the 22x, 42x and 62x ranges.

New Zealand
The allocation of logical channel numbers is governed by Freeview and inserted into the transport stream by mostly Kordia maintained equipment with the encoding done by TVNZ who also do the encoding for all other non critical DVB metadata such as the EPG and channel naming.

SKY Network Television also define their own channel numbering which uses a similar NDS encoded format.  They wholesale their channels to the only other NZ Pay TV operator Vodafone and to the short lived Telecom First Media.

The Freeview LCNs are encoded within a terrestrial broadcast stream using the NorDig descriptor format within the DVB "Network Information Table."  And within the two satellite broadcast streams also using the NorDig descriptor format, but is instead within the DVB "Bouquet Association Table."  The BAT is used on satellite so channel region-ization can be done on certified receivers (i.e., channel order locked receivers).

Usage examples
The order for Freeview is based on how a channel pays for broadcast services:

 nationwide high viewership TV channels are below 20
 nationwide lower viewership TV channels are from 20 to 29
 locally inserted TV channels are from 30 to 40
 local non-Kordia operators are from 41 to 49
 nationwide high priority audio only channels are from 50 to 69
 nationwide low priority audio only channels are from 70 to 79
 TVNZ Provided MHEG-5 Interactive (currently unused) are from 80 to 99
 Broadcast Test channels (no longer used) are from 100 to 199
 TVNZ Provided MHEG-5 non-broadcast Internet streaming are from 200 to 299
 TVNZ Provided System Services (currently unused) from 300 to 399
 TVNZ Provided MHEG-5 Interactive informational channels are from 500 to 599
 TVNZ Provided MHEG-5 Interactive test channels are from 600 to 699
 TVNZ Provided Receiver Downloads are from 700 to 799

The order for Sky is largely based on the channel's content:

 General Entertainment below thirty (before April 2013 was below twenty)
 Movies from 30 to 39 (before April 2013 was 20 to 29)
 Sport from 50 to 69 and 333 (before April 2013 was 30 to 39 and 333)
 Pre-Teenage from 100 to 109 (before April 2013 was 40 to 49)
 Informational from 70 to 79
 Public Service from 80 to 84 (before April 2013 was from 85 to 89)
 News from 85 to 99 (before April 2013 was from 90 to 99)
 Music from 110 to 119 (before April 2013 was 60 to 69)
 Movie Pay Per View from 120 to 139 (before April 2013 was 200 to 219)
 Adult Pay Per View from 140 to 139 (before April 2013 was 200 to 219)
 Religious/State Funded from 200 to 299 (before April 2013 was 110 to 119)
 Asian Language from 300 to 309
 Asian Audio Only from 311 to 314
 Non-Asian Eastern Language from 315 to 319
 Music Audio Only from 400 to 419
 Free to Air Audio Only from 420 to 429 (before April 2013 was 500 to 599)
 Timeshift from 500 to 599 (before April 2013 was 80 to 84)
 System Services from 800 to 999
 Interactive/Miscellaneous (before April 2013 was 50 to 59)
 European (before April 2013 was 100 to 109)

The order for Sky/TVNZ/Kordia Freeview hybrid bundling called Igloo is as follows:

 Primary Freeview national channels from 1 to 5
 Sky Pay TV channels from 6 to 19
 Secondary Freeview national channels from 30 to 39
 Sports related Freeview channels from 40 to 44
 Infomercial Freeview channels from 45 to 49
 News related Freeview channels from 50 to 54
 Religious Freeview channels from 55 to 59
 Secondary language Freeview channels from 60 to 64
 non-English Freeview channels from 65 to 69
 locally inserted English Freeview channels from 80 to 89
 Local non-Freeview channels from 100 to 109
 Freeview audio only channels from 110 to 119

Philippines

As the Philippines started its transition to digital terrestrial television back in 2008, virtual channels have been tentatively assigned to TV networks who are now in operation. In June 2010, the National Telecommunications Commission finally adopted ISDB-T as the sole digital terrestrial television standard in the country.

LCN used in ISDB-T in the Philippines was pre-assigned to the currently operating networks in digital TV. Small-player GEM HD on DZCE-TV was the first ever Philippine TV network to go ISDB-T, being assigned to LCN 2.11 which is using the analog channel 49. Government-owned People's Television Network or PTV was assigned to 1.1 using its analog channel 48 because of its status as government-owned. High definition channels are being assigned with the decimal with "11", while a multiple-SD channel uses decimal with "1, 2, 3... and so on" as its subchannel.

In the first quarter of 2011, the NTC convened to form the TWG-IRR that will draft the implementing rules and regulations on digital TV. Aside from that, it will cover the frequency planning for the upcoming TV networks that will go digital.

Indonesia

In Indonesia itself, the application of LCN is closely related to the digital television migration process launched by the government process. Regulation of the Minister of Communication and Information Technology No. 6/2021 stipulates that LCN itself is given by the Directorate General of Post and Telecommunications (Dirjen Postel) Kemenkominfo RI to television stations that are tenants of multiplexing channels. The LCN itself can be revoked if the television station broadcasting license is revoked or if there is an arrangement for LCN numbering by the government. Television stations themselves can apply for changes to their LCN numbers for several reasons, such as leaving the network broadcast system or another television network or other, but must meet the requirements of the Director General of Post and Telecommunication. Digital broadcast viewers (via television sets/STB), if they press the numbers on the remote control according to the LCN, they will go directly to the television station.

The following are the virtual channel numbers of television networks in Indonesia (generally the same in various regions despite different frequencies, sometimes each regional or transmission station also has a different numbering configuration from the main network):

In terrestrial digital television reception, because the reception position is close to other areas, sometimes there will be duplicated television stations resulting in two or more of the same TV station. Virtual channel numbering will assign the corresponding virtual channel number to TV stations whose signal is stronger, and weaker ones to be placed on channel entries of 800's and above. Likewise for TV stations that do not have virtual channels or the virtual channels have not been configured, they will be included in the 800s entry and sorted by signal strength from highest to lowest or by frequency.

Grouping of virtual channel numbers in terrestrial TV

Digital radio
Digital radio also uses channels and subchannels in the DAB format. iBiquity's HD Radio uses HD1, HD2, ..., HD7 channels.  HD1-3 are available in FM hybrid mode, while all seven HD channels are available in the pure digital mode.
 
IBOC system (Digital Radio Mondiale) stations do not currently use any virtual channels because of the limited bandwidth available in analog sidebands.

References

ATSC
Digital television
Television technology
Broadcast engineering
Television terminology